Ali Tounsi (died February 25, 2010) was the Chief of Algeria's national police force between 1994 and 2010.  He was shot dead in his office in Algiers by a senior police official, with whom he was arguing at the time.  The official, said to be the chief of national police schools, was described as having acted during "an attack of madness".  One source stated that other nearby officers returned fire; others indicated that it was Tounsi himself who wounded his attacker.  The official statement released by the Interior Ministry said that the gunman had shot himself and was taken to a hospital.  Two other people were said to have been injured in the attack.  An inquiry into the killing has been opened.

At the time of his death Tounsi had been the chief of the National Police for over a decade. He was buried at the El Alia Cemetery.

References
Algerian national police chief shot dead: ministry
Chief of Algerian police killed by colleague
C’est officiel. Ali Tounsi tué par balles par le colonel des écoles de police
Algerian Police Chief Assassinated

1937 births
2010 deaths
People from Metz
People murdered in Algeria
Male murder victims
Algerian police officers
Deaths by firearm in Algeria
21st-century Algerian people